Pennsylvania Route 31 (PA 31) is a  state highway located in Western Pennsylvania, paralleling U.S. Route 30 (US 30) and the Pennsylvania Turnpike for most of its length.  The designation begins at PA 136 near West Newton and ends at US 30 near Bedford.

Route description

Westmoreland and Fayette counties
PA 31's designation begins at Pennsylvania Route 136 near West Newton.  It travels east, interchanging with Interstate 70.  After that interchange, PA 31 does not intersect any more numbered roads until it interchanges with U.S. Route 119 in the western part of Mount Pleasant.  When PA 31 interchanges US 119, it turns from a two-lane surface road into first a four-lane road, and then into a city street as it goes through Mount Pleasant.

As PA 31 progresses through Mount Pleasant, it forms a concurrency with Pennsylvania Route 981.  After that, it intersects Pennsylvania Route 819 before leaving the borough and entering the township.

The first intersection with a numbered road after entering the township is Pennsylvania Route 982.  This is the only major intersection until it reaches Donegal.  When it does reach Donegal, there is an entrance ramp to the Pennsylvania Turnpike, and immediately following that is the western terminus of the concurrency with Pennsylvania Route 711.

 later, PA 31 intersects Pennsylvania Route 381.  This marks the eastern terminus of the concurrency with PA 711, and the western terminus of PA 381.  It is also the northern terminus of the PA 381/711 concurrency as well.  Before leaving Donegal Township, PA 31 approaches the eastern terminus of the concurrency with PA 381.  This is the last major intersection before PA 31 winds its way through rural Pennsylvania to Somerset.

Somerset County

Just after crossing the Westmoreland County/Somerset County line (the dividing line between the Pittsburgh metropolitan area and the Johnstown, Pennsylvania metro area, PA 31 provides entrance to the Hidden Valley Ski Resort area.

After winding past rural Westmoreland and Fayette Counties, PA 31 enters Somerset County and encounters the borough of Somerset.  Immediately after entering Somerset, PA 31 intersects Pennsylvania Route 281 and forms a concurrency on one-way pairs.  While being concurrent, both highways intersect the southern terminus of Pennsylvania Route 601.  Not a long while after, PA 31/281 end the concurrency, as PA 281 splits north, while PA 31 continues east.

Past the downtown area, PA 31 weaves through the Pennsylvania Turnpike and passes over U.S. Route 219.  PA 31 continues toward Roxbury, running along the border between Stonycreek Township and Brothersvalley Township. The intersection with Pennsylvania Route 160 is the last intersection in Somerset County and the only one in Roxbury.  After this intersection, PA 31 generally parallels the Turnpike and winds through hilly terrain, passing through Allegheny Township on its way east.

Bedford County
Entering Bedford County, there are no major intersections with any numbered roads until PA 31 enters Manns Choice. Instead, it winds through hilly terrain that parallels the Turnpike. After separating, PA 31 continues for  before terminating at U.S. Route 30.

History
As early as 1772, a road called Glades Road had originally led from Somerset to Bedford, which were the places of two underground railroad stations.  The road would become PA 31 and would go through the towns of West Newton, Mount Pleasant, Monongahela, and Washington that had also organized underground railroad stations.

In 1911, the Sproul Road Bill defined Legislative Route 181 for the segment between Washington and West Newton, LR 186 between West Newton and Somerset, LR 364 between Somerset and Dividing Ridge, and LR 49 between Dividing Ridge and Bedford.

The PA 31 designation began appearing on road maps and signage in 1927.  At that time, the western terminus was at the West Virginia line at West Virginia Route 27.  The east end back then was still at US 30, unchanged from today.  On its way eastward, PA 31 met the southern terminus of PA 28 near Avella, was concurrent with PA 18 and US 19, and traded paths with US 40 in Washington.

In September 1964, the western terminus of PA 31 was truncated to its current location at the intersection of Mount Pleasant Road and Greensburg Pike in West Newton.  Two segments of the decommissioned route were renumbered. PA 136 was designated from the western terminus of PA 31 to US 40/PA 18 in Washington. PA 844 (Jefferson Avenue) was designated from PA 18 (Henderson Avenue) to the PA/WV state line. This left a gap of 1.4 miles of the former PA 31 which ran concurrently with PA 18 (and very briefly with US 40) between the termini of the newly designated routes (PA 844 east, PA 136 west).  As a result, this gap did not need renumbered or any additional designations. PA 31 was truncated in order to avoid intersecting I-70 at multiple locations; the state only wanted state routes to intersect an Interstate highway once to avoid motorist confusion.

Major intersections

Attractions

Glades Pike Inn
The Glades Pike Inn is a notable inn situated on the Glades Pike section of PA 31 in Somerset. Since 1842, the inn was a place for weary travelers to unhitch their horses for a good place to eat and sleep. The modern day visitors of the inn use it for different reasons of traveling. The inn is located in the Laurel Mountains recreational area.

Glades Pike Winery
The Glades Pike Winery is situated on the section of PA 31 known as Glades Pike, between Somerset and Donegal. Established in 1994, the winery is the place where visitors are offered samples of the award-winning wine varieties.

Notes

  May be hard to see, as it is a JPEG map scan.

See also

References

External links

Pennsylvania Highways: PA 31

031
Transportation in Westmoreland County, Pennsylvania
Transportation in Fayette County, Pennsylvania
Transportation in Somerset County, Pennsylvania
Transportation in Bedford County, Pennsylvania